Marginella impudica is a species of sea snail, a marine gastropod mollusk in the family Marginellidae, the margin snails.

Synonyms
 Marginella impudica var. curta Locard, 1897: synonym of Marginella aronnax Bouchet & Warén, 1985
 Marginella impudica var. elongata Locard, 1897: synonym of Marginella impudica P. Fischer, 1884
 Marginella impudica var. major Locard, 1897: synonym of Marginella impudica P. Fischer, 1884
 Marginella impudica var. marginata Locard, 1897: synonym of Marginella aronnax Bouchet & Warén, 1985
 Marginella impudica var. minor Locard, 1897: synonym of Marginella aronnax Bouchet & Warén, 1985
 Marginella impudica var. subturrita Fischer P., 1884: synonym of Marginella subturrita P Fischer, 1884.

Description

Distribution
This marine species occurs in the Atlantic Ocean off the Sahara.

References

 Cossignani T. (2006). Marginellidae & Cystiscidae of the World. L'Informatore Piceno. 408pp.
 Bouchet, P. & Warén, A., 1985. Revision of the northeast Atlantic bathyal and abyssal Neogastropoda excluding Turridae (Mollusca, Gastropoda). Bollettino Malacologico: 120–296, sér. Suppl.1

External links
 Fischer, P. (1884 ["1883"]). Diagnoses d'espèces nouvelles de mollusques recueillis dans le cours de l'expédition scientifique du "Talisman. Journal de Conchyliologie. 31: 391–394
  Locard, A. (1897–1898). Expéditions scientifiques du Travailleur et du Talisman pendant les années 1880, 1881, 1882 et 1883. Mollusques testacés. Paris, Masson.
 Gofas, S.; Le Renard, J.; Bouchet, P. (2001). Mollusca. in: Costello, M.J. et al. (eds), European Register of Marine Species: a check-list of the marine species in Europe and a bibliography of guides to their identification. Patrimoines Naturels. 50: 180–213

impudica
Gastropods described in 1883